The Castle of Gjon Boçari is a castle of the 16th and 17th century in Tragjas, Albania.

Architecture 

The castle was built by the Boçari family, one of the principal Albanian families of Tragjas, Vlorë, southwestern Albania in the 16th and expanded in the 17th century. The fortification features arrowslits for artillery openings in the walls. The northern and eastern corners of the castle feature large towers.

Sources 

Castles in Albania
Buildings and structures in Vlorë